The 1944 Queensland state election was held on 15 April 1944.

By-elections
 On 30 August 1941, Harry O'Shea (Labor) was elected to succeed Randolph Bedford (Labor), who had died on 7 July 1941, as the member for Warrego.
 On 31 October 1942, Lou Barnes (Independent Labor) was elected to succeed John O'Keefe (Labor), who had died on 27 January 1942, as the member for Cairns.
 On 20 March 1943, Fred Graham (Labor) was elected to succeed William Forgan Smith (Labor), who had resigned on 9 December 1942, as the member for Mackay.
 On 17 April 1943, Tom Kerr (United Australia) was elected to succeed Thomas Nimmo (United Australia), who had died on 6 February 1943, as the member for Oxley.
 On 1 May 1943, Ned Davis (Labor) was elected to succeed Frank Bulcock (Labor), who had resigned on 15 December 1942, as the member for Barcoo.
 On 9 October 1943, John Chandler (Queensland People's Party) was elected to succeed Bruce Pie (Independent Democrat), who had resigned on 30 June 1943, as the member for Hamilton.

Retiring Members
Note: Independent Country MLA William Deacon (Cunningham) died before the election; no by-election was held.

Labor
Charles Conroy MLA (Maranoa)
John Dash MLA (Mundingburra)

Country
David Daniel MLA (Keppel)

Candidates
Sitting members at the time of the election are shown in bold text.

See also
 1944 Queensland state election
 Members of the Queensland Legislative Assembly, 1941–1944
 Members of the Queensland Legislative Assembly, 1944–1947
 List of political parties in Australia

References
 

Candidates for Queensland state elections